Severe Cyclonic Storm Asani was a strong tropical cyclone that made landfall in India in May 2022. The third depression and deep depression, and the first named storm of the 2022 North Indian Ocean cyclone season, Asani originated from a depression that the Indian Meteorological Department first monitored on May 7. Conditions rapidly favored development as the system became a deep depression by that day before intensifying to a Cyclonic Storm Asani. On the next day it further intensified and peak to a severe cyclonic storm, before making landfall as a deep depression system over Andhra Pradesh. It degenerated into a well marked low-pressure on May 12.

Meteorological history 

During the first week of May, a strong pulse of Madden-Julian Oscillation (MJO) and Equatorial Rossby wave (ERW) prevailed in this basin. These two conditions led to a formation, of a cyclonic circulation, over the southern Andaman Sea on May 4. At the same day, a Westerly wind burst occurred which resulted in formation of twin cyclones over the Indian Ocean. the southern hemisphere counterpart being Tropical Cyclone Karim and the northern hemisphere counterpart being this cyclonic circulation. The United States Joint Typhoon Warning Center (JTWC) followed the suit and designated as Invest 92B on the next day.

During May 6, under the influence of the disturbance, a low pressure system off the coast of Andaman and Nicobar Islands. Subsequently, the JTWC issued its Tropical Cyclone Formation Alert (TCFA), as it had rapidly consolidated its convective structure for the past few hours, along with development a well-defined low-level center.

Late on May 7, the system became more well-marked low pressure area over the same region. At 09:00 UTC, the JTWC initiated advisories on the system and classified it as Tropical Cyclone 02B, while India Meteorological Department (IMD) followed the suit and upgraded it to Depression BOB 03. Three hours later, the system was further upgraded to a deep depression status by the IMD, after forming a defined central dense overcast cloud pattern. By 00:00 UTC of the next day, the system organized into cyclonic storm and was assigned the named Asani, becoming the first cyclone of the season. Nine hours later, the JTWC upgraded it to a Category 1-equivalent system on the Saffir–Simpson hurricane wind scale (SSHWS). At 12:00 UTC, the IMD further upgraded it to a severe cyclonic storm, as the Microwave imaging shows well-organized system.

The cyclone began to encounter high wind shear due to which the JTWC downgraded it as a tropical storm on May 10, while the IMD continue to maintain it as a severe cyclonic storm. it began to make a sudden westward jog and mild decrease in wind shear made the JTWC to upgrade it again into a Category 1-equivalent tropical cyclone. Nine hours later, Cyclone Asani was further downgraded into a tropical storm, it began to weaken due to higher wind shear as well as dry air intrusion. Thereafter, storm rapidly weakened into a cyclonic storm on May 11.  At 12:00 UTC it further degenerated into a deep depression as made landfall in Indian State of Andhra Pradesh.  The JTWC discontinue advisories for the system, at 15:00 UTC  The next day, The IMD reported that the system had weakened into a depression while moving inlands. Asani eventually degenerating into a well-marked low pressure area and IMD issued its last advisory.

Preparations and impact

India 
The Government of India's Union Home Secretary Ajay Kumar Bhalla had reviewed prepared for the cyclone deployed nine team and keep seven team in Andhra Pradesh, and Odisha by the National Disaster Response Force (NDRF) and additional team also have been readied. The IMD issued the cyclone's warnings over Andhra Pradesh. In West Bengal, Kolkata Municipal Corporation prepared their teams to start work immediately after the damage by the cyclone.

In Visakhapatnam, Indian Navy has prepared six diving teams and 19 flood relief teams for assistance to civil authorities, along with five Indian Navy ships with relief material, and diving teams along the coast of Andhra Pradesh and Odisha. The cyclone's associated strong wind caused very heavy rain over Kerala, Andhra Pradesh, and Odisha. IndiGo cancelled 23 flights from Visakhapatnam International Airport. four Air Asia flights were also cancelled at the place for the day, 10 flights at the Chennai airport, including those from Hyderabad, Visakhapatnam, Jaipur and Mumbai, also had been canceled. About 30,225 estimate crops were affected. Damage in Nandyal, Anantapur and Sri Sathya Sai districts wasestimated at Rs121.2 million (US$1.57 million).

Three fatalities were confirmed from the cyclone as of May 19. A Mandal Parishad Territorial Constituency (MPTC) from YSR Congress Party was killed after a Palymra tree fell over him. A 43-year-old man was killed as a wall collapsed over him in the house of Kamanagaruvu village in Amalapuram. Another man was killed by a lightning strike at Jalandaki in Nellore district.

Bangladesh 
4,915 cyclone shelter centres has been prepared by Barisal divisional administration in five coastal districts, two million people in livestock. District Administration of Cox’s Bazar has also taken necessary measures for refugee Rohingyas in Ukhia and Teknaf camps.

See also 

Weather of 2022
Tropical cyclones in 2022
Cyclone Lehar — a tropical cyclone that affected the Indian state of Andhra Pradesh.
Cyclone Laila — last cyclone to hit Andhra Pradesh during the month of May. 
Cyclone Yaas — a strong tropical cyclone that made landfall in Odisha during May 2021.
Cyclone Phailin  — an intense tropical cyclone during October 2013. 
Cyclone Bijli —  a weak tropical cyclone that impacted Myanmar.
Cyclone Jawad — a tropical cyclone during December 2021

Notes

References

External links 

 JTWC Best Track Data of Tropical Cyclone 02B (Asani)
 02B.ASANI from the U.S. Naval Research Laboratory

Asani
2022 North Indian Ocean cyclone season
Severe cyclonic storms
Tropical cyclones in India
2022 meteorology
2022 disasters in India
May 2022 events in India